Crocus versicolor is a species of flowering plant in the genus Crocus of the family Iridaceae, found in southeast France, Monaco, and northwestern Italy.

Flowering occurs from February to April, it is found growing in scrub environments and among rocks to an elevation of 1200 meters.

References

versicolor
Plants described in 1808